Marius Barnard and Piet Norval were the defending champions, but Norval did not compete this year. Barnard teamed up with Fernon Wibier and lost in the first round to Doug Flach and T. J. Middleton.

Justin Gimelstob and Brett Steven won the title by defeating Kent Kinnear and Aleksandar Kitinov 6–3, 6–4 in the final.

Seeds

Draw

Draw

References

External links
 Official results archive (ATP)
 Official results archive (ITF)

Hall of Fame Tennis Championships - Doubles
Hall of Fame Open